The 2021–22 season was the 112th season of competitive football in Germany.

Promotion and relegation

Pre-season

Post-season

National teams

Germany national football team

Kits

2022 FIFA World Cup qualification

2022 FIFA World Cup qualification Group J

2022 FIFA World Cup qualification fixtures and results

2022–23 UEFA Nations League

2022–23 UEFA Nations League A Group 3

2022–23 UEFA Nations League fixtures and results

Friendly matches

Germany Olympic football team

2020 Summer Olympics

Due to the COVID-19 pandemic, the games have been postponed to the summer of 2021. However, their official name remains 2020 Summer Olympics.

2020 Summer Olympics Group D

2020 Summer Olympics fixtures and results

Germany women's national football team

Kits

2023 FIFA Women's World Cup qualification

2023 FIFA Women's World Cup qualification Group H

2023 FIFA Women's World Cup qualification fixtures and results

2022 Arnold Clark Cup

Friendly matches

League season

Men

Bundesliga

Bundesliga standings

2. Bundesliga

2. Bundesliga standings

3. Liga

3. Liga standings

Women

Frauen-Bundesliga

Frauen-Bundesliga standings

2. Frauen-Bundesliga

2. Frauen-Bundesliga standings

Cup competitions

Men

DFB-Pokal

Final

DFL-Supercup

Women

DFB-Pokal Frauen

German clubs in Europe

UEFA Champions League

Group stage

Group A

Group C

Group E

Group G

Knockout phase

Round of 16

|}

Quarter-finals

|}

UEFA Europa League

Group stage

Group D

Group G

Knockout phase

Knockout round play-offs

|}

Round of 16

|}
Notes

Quarter-finals

|}

Semi-finals

|}

Final

UEFA Europa Conference League

Qualifying phase and play-off round

Play-off round

|}

Group stage

Group E

UEFA Women's Champions League

Qualifying rounds

Round 1

Semi-finals

|}

Final

|}

Round 2

|}

Group stage

Group A

Group C

Group D

Knockout phase

Quarter-finals

|}

Semi-finals

|}

References

 
Seasons in German football